Ryan Heckman (born March 7, 1974) is an American nordic combined skier who competed from 1992 to 1997. He finished eighth in the 3 x 10 km team event at the 1992 Winter Olympics in Albertville. Heckman's best World Cup finish was eighth in a 15 km individual event in Finland in 1995.

Heckman is now a partner at a private equity firm in Denver, Colorado.

External links
Nordic combined team Olympic results: 1988-2002 

Wall Street Journal Profile of Ryan Heckman
Ryan Heckman Excellere
Ryan Heckman article in the Denver Post

American male Nordic combined skiers
Nordic combined skiers at the 1992 Winter Olympics
Nordic combined skiers at the 1994 Winter Olympics
Living people
1974 births
Olympic Nordic combined skiers of the United States